František Bubák (22 July 1866, in Rovensko pod Troskami – 19 September 1925, in Prague) was a Czech mycologist and phytopathologist.

From 1902 to 1919, he served as a professor at the provincial academy in Tábor, followed by a professorship in botany and plant pathology at the agricultural university in Brno. From 1920 to 1925, he was a professor at the Czech Technical University in Prague (Faculty of Agriculture and Forestry).

He was the author of numerous papers involving fungi native to Bohemia, Bosnia, Bulgaria, Galicia, Hungary, Istria, Montenegro, Moravia, Russia and Tyrol. He also published works on North American fungi. The mycological genus Bubakia is named in his honor.

Selected works 
 O rezich, které eizopasi na některych Rubiaceich, 1899.
 Einige neue oder kritische Uromyces-Arten, 1903 – On some new or critical Uromyces species.
 Infektionsversuche mit einigen Uredineen. Zentralblatt für Bakteriologie, Parasitenkunde, Infektionskrankheiten und Hygiene Abt. 2 9: 913-[925], 1902 – Infection experiments with some members of Uredineae.
 Mykologische Beiträge, 1904 – Mycological contributions.
 "Fungi Imperfecti Exsiccati" Fasc. 8 : nos 351-400, with Josef Emanuel Kabát (1849–1925).
 Eine neue Krankheit der Maulbeerbäume. 2. Bericht der Deutschen Botanischen Gesellschaft 29: 70-74, 1911 – A new disease affecting mulberry trees. 
 Ein neuer Pilz mit sympodialer Konidienbildung. Bericht der Deutschen Botanischen Gesellschaft 29: 381-385, 1911 – A new fungus with sympodial conidia.

References 

1866 births
1925 deaths
Czech mycologists
Phytopathologists
People from Semily District